is a manga series by Kō Kojima which ran in the adult magazine Weekly Asahi Geinō, published by Tokuma Shoten in Japan. It is the longest running comic with only one artist, being published weekly since October 1956, and the longest-running strip ever in Japan. By contrast, Golgo 13 is the longest running manga to be serialized in a dedicated manga magazine with Doraemon the second longest, and Kochira Katsushika-ku Kameari Kōen-mae Hashutsujo (Kochi-Kame) the third longest (Asahi Geino is not a dedicated manga magazine). While Sennin Buraku has been running for more years than Peanuts, Charles M. Schulz's strip has more "episodes" as it ran daily rather than weekly. The story was a romantic comedy taking place in historical China, and it was quite risqué for its time.  The characters were very traditionally dressed (e.g. all wearing hanfu).  Although the anime is very hard to find, it has been rerun on Japanese television, all episodes have appeared  on DVD (save for episodes 12 and 19), and episodes have been saved on Internet torrents.

Sennin Buraku was the first late night anime, broadcast shortly before midnight on Fuji TV from September 4, 1963 to February 23, 1964. This was the first anime series produced by Tele-Cartoon Japan, and a page exists on their website about it. The series was in black and white and ran for 23 episodes. A live action movie was released in 1961, titled .

With the August 7, 2014 issue, it was announced that the series would be placed on hiatus. The death of the artist on April 14, 2015 puts any future chapters of Sennin Buraku in doubt.

Plot summary
Sennin Buraku takes place in Taoyuan, a small Edo period village, populated solely by Taoist ascetics.  The eldest, Lao Shi, conducts research into magic and alchemy, while his disciple Zhi Huang remains more interested in pleasures of the flesh.  He has fallen for three pretty sisters who live nearby, much to Lao Shi's annoyance.

Manga
While the manga has run in Weekly Asahi Geinō for over fifty years, there have been no translations of it.

Live action movie
The 83-minute live action movie was titled Fūryū Kokkei-tan: Sennin Buraku, and was released in theaters by Shintoho on 1961-02-08.

Cast
Akiko Matsuyama: Mayumi Ōzora
Tenpei Naiki: Yōichi Numata
Yōko Kondō: Mako Sanjō
Doctor: Bokuzen Hidari
Laundry boy: Akihiro Maruyama
Daikichi Narayama: Bunta Sugawara

Staff
Director: Morihei Magatani
Planning: Mitsuo Nakatsuka
Screenplay: Isao Matsumoto
Cinematographer: Shigenobu Yoshida
Art Director: Haruyasu Kurosawa
Music: Keitarō Miho

Anime series
Each episode of the anime series was 15 minutes long. The first eight episodes were broadcast from 23:40 to 23:55 on Wednesday nights on Fuji TV following the world news, and episodes nine through 23 were broadcast from 23:30 to 23:45 on sunday nights.

The opening theme song, Sennin Buraku no Thema, was sung by Three Graces, arranged by Tōru Kino and the lyrics were written by Takeo Yamashita.

Cast
Sennin: Hyakushō San'yūtei
Ichikawa Danjūrō
Yoshiaki Hanayagi
Tomoko Kokai
Ichirō Nagai

Staff
Director: Shigeharu Kaneko
Screenplay: Akira Hayasaka, Tōru Kino
Production: TCJ

Sources:

References

External links
 Lambiek article about Koo Kojima
 Sennin Buraku in Animemorial (contains episodes list + screenshot)
 
 

1956 manga
1961 films
1963 anime television series debuts
Eiken (studio)
Fuji TV original programming
Japanese romantic comedy films
Romantic comedy anime and manga
Satirical comics
Films with screenplays by Akira Hayasaka
Shintoho films
Tokuma Shoten manga
1960s Japanese films